Lino Del Fra (20 June 192719 July 1997) was an Italian director and screenwriter.

Biography
Pasqualino Del Fra was born in Rome. He graduated with a degree in philosophy and pedagogy at the faculty of letters of the Capitoline University. In the early 1950s he worked as a film critic in the pages of the newspaper L'Avanti and the magazines Cinema Nuovo and Bianco Nero. He began his career as a documentary filmmaker in the 1960s, taking part in the 1962 collective documentary All'armi, siam fascisti!

In 1961, he won the Golden Lion at the Venice International Film Festival for the short film Fata Morgana, which deals with southern Italian emigrants to Northern Italy.

He won the Golden Leopard at the Locarno Film Festival for the 1977 film Antonio Gramsci: The Days of Prison, his cinematographic work was marked by the collaboration with his wife Cecilia Mangini.

Filmography
Fata Morgana (1961), documentario di 11 minuti
All'armi, siam fascisti, documentario co-diretto con Cecilia Mangini e Lino Micciché (1962)
La statua di Stalin, cortometraggio co-diretto con Cecilia Mangini (1963)
I misteri di Roma, documentario co-diretto (1963)
La torta in cielo (1973)
Antonio Gramsci: The Days of Prison (1977)
 (1994)

References

External links
 

1927 births
1997 deaths
Film directors from Rome
Italian male screenwriters
20th-century Italian screenwriters
20th-century Italian male writers
Writers from Rome